Orla Fitzsimons (born 22 August 1981) is a female rugby union player. She was a member of 's 2014 Women's Rugby World Cup squad. She and Paula Fitzpatrick are also teammates at St Mary's College. She previously played for Barnhall RFC in 2007.

References

1981 births
Living people
Irish female rugby union players
Ireland women's international rugby union players
St Mary's College RFC players